Ravana is a mythical multi-headed rakshasa (demon) king of the island of Lanka in Hindu mythology, and the chief antagonist in the Hindu epic Ramayana and its adaptations. In the Ramayana, Ravana is described as the eldest son of sage Vishrava and rakshasi Kaikesi. He abducted Prince Rama's wife, Sita, and took her to his kingdom of Lanka, where he held her in the Ashoka Vatika. Rama, with the support of vanara King Sugriva and his army of vanaras, launched an invasion against Ravana in Lanka. Ravana was subsequently slain, and Rama rescued his beloved wife Sita.

Ravana is widely portrayed as being an evil character, though he is also a learned scholar. He was well-versed in the six shastras and the four Vedas. Ravana is also considered to be the most revered devotee of Shiva. Images of Ravana are often seen associated with Shiva at temples. He also appears in the Buddhist Mahayana text Laṅkāvatāra Sūtra, in Buddhist Ramayanas and Jatakas, as well as in Jain Ramayanas. In some scriptures, he is depicted as one of Vishnu's cursed doorkeepers.

Etymology 

The word Rāvaṇa (Sanskrit: रावण) means "roaring" (active), the opposite of Vaiśravaṇa which means to "hear distinctly" (passive). Both Ravana and Vaiśravaṇa, who is commonly known as Kubera, are considered to be patronymics derived from "sons of Vishrava".

Ravana was a title later taken on by Dashānana, and it means "the one with ten (dasha) faces (anana)". Further, roravana is Sanskrit for "loud roaring." In Abhinava Gupta's Krama Shaiva scripture, yāsām rāvanam is used as an expression to mean people who are truly aware of the materialism of their environment.

Ravana has many other popular names such as Dasis Ravana, Dasis Sakvithi Maha Ravana, Dashaanan, Ravula, Lankapati, Lankeshwar, Lankeshwaran, Ravanasura, Ravanaeshwaran, and Eela Vendhar.

Iconography 
Ravana is depicted and described as having ten heads, although he is sometimes shown with only nine heads since he cut one off to convince Shiva. He is described as a devout follower of Shiva, a great scholar, a capable ruler, and a maestro of the Veena. Ravana is also depicted as the author of the Ravana Samhita, a book on Hindu astrology, and the Arka Prakasham, a book on Siddha medicine and treatment. Ravana possessed a thorough knowledge of Siddha and political science. He is said to have possessed the nectar of immortality, which was stored inside his belly thanks to a celestial boon from Brahma.

Life and legends

Birth 

Ravana was born to the sage Vishrava and the Rakshasa princess Kaikesi in Treta Yuga. Villagers from Bisrakh in Uttar Pradesh claim that Bisrakh was named after Vishrava, and that Ravana was born there. However, according to Hela historical sources and folklore, Ravana was born in Lanka, where he later became king.

Ravana's paternal grandfather, the sage Pulastya, was one of the ten Prajapatis, or mind-born sons of Brahma, and one of the Saptarishi (Seven Great Sages Rishi) in the first Manvantara (age of Manu). His maternal grandfather was Sumali (or Sumalaya), the king of the Rakshasas and the son of Sukesha. Sumali had ten sons and four daughters. Sumali wished for Kaikesi to marry the most powerful being in the mortal world, so as to produce an exceptional heir. He rejected the kings of the world, as they were less powerful than him. Kaikesi searched among the sages and finally chose Vishrava, the father of Kubera. Ravana and his siblings were born to the couple and they completed their education from their father, with Ravana being a great scholar of the Vedas.

Boon of Ravana 
Ravana and his two brothers, Kumbhakarna and Vibhishana, performed penance on Mount Gokarna for 11,000 years and won boons from Brahma. Ravana was blessed with a boon that would make him invincible to all the creations of Brahma, except for humans. He also received weapons, a chariot, as well as the ability to shapeshift from Brahma. Ravana later usurped Lanka from his half-brother Kubera, and became the King of Lanka. He appointed Shukracharya as his priest, and learned the Arthashastra (Science of Politics) from him.

Devotee of Shiva 

One of the most popular images of Shiva is called "Ravananugraha", which was popular in the Gupta era. It depicts Ravana beneath Mount Kailash playing a veena made out of his head and hands, and strings made out of his tendons, while Shiva and Parvati sit on top of the mountain. According to scriptures, Ravana once tried to lift Mount Kailash, but Shiva pushed the mountain into place and trapped Ravana beneath it. For a thousand years, the imprisoned Ravana sang Shiva Tandava Stotra, a hymn in praise of Shiva, who finally blessed him and granted him an invincible sword and a powerful linga (Shiva's iconic symbol, Atmalinga) to worship.

Family 
Ravana's parents were sage Vishrava (son of Pulastya) and Kaikesi (daughter of Sumali and Tataka or Ketumati). Ravana had ten maternal uncles and three maternal aunts. Dhumraksha, Prahastha, Akampana, Maricha, and Subahu, a few of his maternal uncles, were generals in the Lanka army. Kaikesi's father, Sumali, was instrumental in making Ravana the king of Lanka by advising him to get boons from Brahma, defeat Kubera, and establish Rakshasa rule in the three worlds.

Ravana's granduncle was Malyavan, who opposed the war with Rama and Lakshmana. He also had another granduncle named Mali who was killed by Lord Vishnu.

Ravana had seven brothers and two sisters, named Kubera, Kumbhakarna, Vibhishana, Khara, Dushana, Ahiravan, Kumbhini, Sahastra Ravana, and Shurpanakha.

Ravana had three wives, Mandodari, the daughter of the celestial architect Maya, Dhanyamalini, and a third wife. His sons from his three wives were Meghnaad, Atikaya, Akshayakumara, Narantaka, Devantaka, Trishira, and Prahasta.

Priestly ministers 
In some accounts, Ravana is said to have had Shukracharya, the priest of the Asuras, as his minister, and in other accounts, Brihaspati, the priest of the Devas.

One account narrates how Ravana ordered Brihaspati to recite the Chandi stava (mantras of Chandi), more specifically the Devi Mahatmya, in order to stave off defeat. According to the Krttivasa text, Ravana arranged for a peaceful yajna, and invited Brihaspati to start the recitation of Chandi.

Other legends

Vishnu's cursed doorkeeper 
In the Bhagavata Purana, Ravana and his brother Kumbhakarna are said to be reincarnations of Jaya and Vijaya, gatekeepers at Vaikuntha (the abode of Vishnu), and were cursed to be born on Earth for their insolence.

These gatekeepers refused entry to the Sanatha Kumara monks who, because of their powers and austerity, appeared as young children. For their insolence, the monks cursed them to be expelled from Vaikuntha and to be born on Earth.

Vishnu agreed that they should be punished and gave them two options. First, that they could be born seven times as normal mortals and devotees of Vishnu, or strong and three times as powerful, but as enemies of Vishnu. Eager to be back with the Lord, they chose the latter option. The curse of the first birth was fulfilled by Hiranyakashipu and his brother Hiranyaksha in Satya Yuga, when they were both vanquished by earlier avatars of Vishnu (Hiranyaksha by Varaha, and Hiranyakashipu by Narasimha). Ravana and his brother Kumbhakarna were born to fulfill the curse in their second birth as enemies of Vishnu in Treta Yuga. The curse of the third birth was fulfilled by Dantavakra and Shishupala in the Dvapara Yuga, when they both were slain by Krishna, the eighth avatar.

Conflict with other kings and Asuras 
Throughout his life, Ravana had gotten into conflict with several major Asuras. In Maheshwar, Madhya Pradesh, he is said to have fought and lost to Kartavirya Arjuna. Ravana was vanquished by the Ikshvaku King Mandhata, an ancestor of Rama, as well as by the sage Kapila. In the Ramayana, he fought Vali, the Kishkindha king, but was defeated by him because of his boon to obtain half the strength of anyone he fought. He also fought with the Nivatakavachas, descendants of Prahlada, but struck an alliance with them after being unable to defeat them.

Once, upon hearing a discourse from Sage Sanatkumara, Ravana attempted to invade Vaikuntha. Only Ravana managed to enter Vaikuntha's capital, Shwetadwipa, where he was hopelessly outmatched by the inhabitants and was forced to retreat.

He killed Anaranya, the king of Ayodhya, although he cursed Ravana to be slain by Rama.

Ravana had wrestled his brother Kubera for the Pushpaka Vimana.

He also fought Marutta (Chakravarti King of Ushiraviga), Gadhi (Vishwamitra's father), Dushyanta (Bharata's father), Suratha (King of Vidarbha), Gaya (Chakravarti king of Dharmaranya), and Paurava (King of Anga).

Worship and temples

Worship 
Ravana is worshipped as one of Shiva's most revered followers, and he is even worshipped in some Shiva temples.

Ravana is worshiped by the Kanyakubja Brahmins of the Vidisha region, who see him as a savior and a sign of prosperity, claiming Ravana was also a Kanyakubja Brahmin. Thousands of Kanyakubja Brahmins of the village Ravangram of Netaran, in the Vidisha District of Madhya Pradesh, perform daily puja in the Ravana temple and offer naivedyam or bhog (a ritual of sacrifice to the gods). 

King Shiv Shankar built a Ravana temple in Kanpur, Uttar Pradesh. The Ravana temple is open once a year, on the day of Dashera, to perform puja for the welfare of Ravana.

Ravana is also worshiped by Hindus of Bisrakh, who claim their town to be his birthplace.

The Sachora Brahmins of Gujarat claim to be descendants of Ravana, and sometimes have "Ravan" as their surnames.

Saraswat Brahmins from Mathura claim Ravana as a saraswat Brahmin as per his lineage.

There has also been reference to "Ravani", the lineage of Upadhyaya Yasastrata II, who was of the Gautama gotra and Acharya Vasudatta's son, and described as "born of Ravani".

The Gondi people of central India claim to be descendants of Ravana, and  have temples for him, his wife Mandodari, and their son Meghnad. They also state that Ravana was an ancient Gond king, the tenth dharmaguru of their tribe, and the eighteenth lingo (divine teacher). Annually on Dussehra, the Gondis from the village of Paraswadi carry an image of Ravana riding on an elephant in a procession.

Temples 
The following temples in India are for Ravana as a Shiva Bhakta.
 Dashanan Temple, Kanpur, Uttar Pradesh
 Ravana Temple, Bisrakh, Greater Noida, Uttar Pradesh
 Kakinada Ravana Temple, Andhra Pradesh
 Ravangram Ravana Temple, Vidisha, Madhya Pradesh
 Mandsaur, Madhya Pradesh
 Mandore Ravan Temple, Jodhpur
 Baijanath Temple, Kangra District, Himachal Pradesh

Influence on culture and art

Ravana-Dahan (burning effigy of Ravana) 

Effigies of Ravana are burned on Vijayadashami in many places throughout India to symbolize Rama's triumph over evil.

Ravanahatha 
According to mythology, the ravanahatha, an ancient bowed string instrument, was created by Ravana and is still used as a Rajasthani folk instrument.

In other religions 

In the Rin-spuns-pa Tibetan Ramayana, it is prophesied that Ravana will return as the Buddha incarnation of Vishnu in Kali Yuga.
 
The Arunachal Pradesh Tai Khamti Ramayana (Phra Chow Lamang) shows Rama as a Bodhisattva who was reborn so Ravana could torture him.
 
In the Laotian Buddhist text Phra Lak Phra Lam, Rama is a Bodhisattva and the embodiment of virtues, while Ravana is a Brahmin ("mahabrahma") son of Virulaha who is highly materialistic.
 
In the Cambodian Buddhist text Preah Ream, Buddha is an incarnation of Rama and Ravana is a rakshasa.
 
In the Thai Buddhist text Ramakien, Ravana is a rakshasa known as "Thotsakan" (ทศกัณฐ์, from Sanskrit दशकण्ठ, Daśakaṇṭha, "ten necks"), and is depicted with green skin.
 
In the Karandavyuha Sutra, Yama asks if the visitor in hell (Avalokitesvara), whom he hasn't seen yet, is a god or a demon, and whether he is Vishnu, Mahesvara, or the rakshasa Ravana.

Jainism 

Jain accounts vary from the traditional Hindu accounts of the Ramayana. The incidents are placed at the time of the 20th Tirthankara, Munisuvrata. In Jainism, both Rama and Ravana were devout Jains. Ravana was a Vidyadhara king who had magical powers, and Lakshmana, not Rama, was the one who ultimately killed Ravana.

Dravidian movement 
Pulavar Kuzhanthai's Ravana Kaaviyam is a panegyric on Ravana that is made up of 3,100 poetic stanzas in which Ravana is the hero. The book was released in 1946, and was subsequently banned by India's Congress led government. The ban was later lifted in 1971.

In popular culture
Sri Lanka named its first satellite Raavana 1 after Ravana.

Films

Television

See also 
 Asura
 Bull Demon King
 Daitya
 Danava (Hinduism)
 Keibu Keioiba
 Raksasa

References

Bibliography

External links 

 

Brahmins
Characters in the Ramayana
Danavas
Evil deities
People whose existence is disputed
Rakshasa in the Ramayana
Salakapurusa